The eight-spotted miner bee (Perdita octomaculata) is a species of miner bee in the family Andrenidae. Another common name for this species is the eight-spotted perdita. It is found in North America.

Subspecies
These two subspecies belong to the species Perdita octomaculata:
 Perdita octomaculata octomaculata
 Perdita octomaculata terminata Cockerell, 1922-28

References—

Further reading

External links

 

Andrenidae
Articles created by Qbugbot
Insects described in 1824